Fisherman's Wharf is a neighborhood and popular tourist attraction in San Francisco, California. It roughly encompasses the northern waterfront area of San Francisco from Ghirardelli Square or Van Ness Avenue east to Pier 35 or Kearny Street. The F Market streetcar runs through the area, the Powell-Hyde cable car line runs to Aquatic Park, at the edge of Fisherman's Wharf, and the Powell-Mason cable car line runs a few blocks away.

History

San Francisco's Fisherman's Wharf gets its name and neighborhood characteristics from the city's early days of the mid to later 1800s when Italian immigrant fishermen came to the city to take advantage of the influx of population due to the gold rush. Most of the Italian immigrant fishermen settled in the North Beach area close to the wharf and fished for the local delicacies and dungeness crab. From then until the present day the wharf remained the center of operations for San Francisco's fishing fleet. Despite its redevelopment into a tourist attraction during the 1970s and 1980s, the area is still home to many active fishermen and their fleets.

In 2010, a $15 million development plan was proposed by city officials hoping to revitalize its appearance for tourists, and to reverse the area's downward trend in popularity among San Francisco residents.

On the morning of May 23, 2020, a four-alarm fire burned a fish-processing warehouse on Pier 45, resulting in a partial collapse of the warehouse, and damage to two other buildings. No injuries were reported.

Attractions and characteristics
One of the busiest and well known tourist attractions in the western United States, Fisherman's Wharf is best known for being the location of Pier 39, the Cannery Shopping Center, Ghirardelli Square, a Ripley's Believe it or Not museum, the Musée Mécanique, Wax Museum at Fishermans Wharf, and the San Francisco Maritime National Historical Park.

Seafood restaurants are plentiful in the area, including the floating Forbes Island restaurant at Pier 39 to stands that serve fresh seafood. Some of the restaurants, including Fishermen's Grotto, Pompei's Grotto and Alioto's, go back for three generations of the same family ownership. Other restaurants include chains like Applebee's and Bubba Gump Shrimp Co. The area also has an In-N-Out Burger; local business leaders said they opposed every other fast food chain except In-N-Out, because they wanted to maintain the flavor of family-owned, decades-old businesses in the area, with one saying locals would ordinarily "be up in arms about a fast-food operation coming to Fisherman's Wharf," but the family-owned In-N-Out "is different."

Other attractions in Fisherman's Wharf area are the Hyde Street Pier (part of the San Francisco Maritime National Historical Park), the USS Pampanito, a decommissioned World War II era submarine, and the Balclutha, a 19th-century cargo ship. Nearby Pier 45 has a chapel in memory of the "Lost Fishermen" of San Francisco and Northern California.

There is a sea lion colony next to Pier 39. They "took-up" residence months before the Loma Prieta earthquake in 1989. The sea lions lie on wooden docks that were originally used for docking boats.

Fisherman's Wharf plays host to many San Francisco events, including a firework display on the Fourth of July and some of the best views of the Fleet Week air shows featuring The Blue Angels.

Pier 45
The USS Pampanito (SS-383) and SS Jeremiah O'Brien are National Historic Landmarks, preserved as a memorial and museum ships as part of the San Francisco Maritime National Park Association located at the Wharf.

In popular culture
In 1985, the wharf was used as a filming location in the James Bond film A View to a Kill, where Bond (played for the last time by Roger Moore) met with CIA agent Chuck Lee (David Yip) in his quest to eliminate the villain of the film, Max Zorin (Christopher Walken).

See also

 Hyde Street Pier, old automobile ferry site made obsolete by the Golden Gate and Bay Bridges
 49-Mile Scenic Drive
 Fisherman's Wharves in other places
 F Market, the San Francisco Municipal Railway historic streetcar linking the Wharf to Market Street
 Pier 39
 Musée Mécanique
 Red & White Fleet bay cruises

References

Further reading
San Francisco's Fisherman's Wharf, Alessandro Baccari Jr. Arcadia Publishing (2006)

External links

Fisherman's Wharf Merchants Association (including wharf history and visitor information)
JB Monaco Fisherman's Wharf Photo Gallery

 
Busking venues
Neighborhoods in San Francisco
Wharves in the United States
Pier fires
San Francisco Bay
Redeveloped ports and waterfronts in the United States
Tourist attractions in San Francisco
Shopping districts and streets in the San Francisco Bay Area